Prostanthera clotteniana is a species of flowering plant in the family Lamiaceae and is endemic to tropical north Queensland.  It is a shrub with cylindrical, hairy branches, narrow egg-shaped leaves with the narrower end towards the base, and purple to pale lilac flowers.

Description

Taxonomy
In 1904, Frederick Manson Bailey formally described Hemigenia clotteniana in the Queensland Agricultural Journal and in 1905 described Prostanthera atroviolacea in the same journal, specimens of both plants collected near Herberton. In 2000, Anthony Bean considered the two names to be synonyms and raised the new name Prostanthera clotteniana in the journal Austrobaileya. The species was named "after F. E. Clotten, who furnished the funds for printing a general index to “The Queensland Flora”".

Distribution and habitat
Prostanthera clotteniana grows in dry woodland on steep, rocky slopes in the Ravenshoe–Atherton area of north-east Queensland where it is only known from seven sites. It was thought to be extinct until rediscovered in 1999.

Conservation status
This species is classified as "critically endangered" under the Australian Government Environment Protection and Biodiversity Conservation Act and the Queensland Government Nature Conservation Act 1992. The main threats to the species are inappropriate fire regimes and habitat disturbance caused by mining, illegal collection and weed invasion.

References

clotteniana
Flora of Queensland
Lamiales of Australia
Taxa named by Anthony Bean
Plants described in 2000
Endemic flora of Queensland